Gullapudi is a village in Krishna district of the Indian state of Andhra Pradesh. It is located in Musunuru mandal of Nuzvid revenue division.

Politics 

Gullapudi falls under the administration of Musunuru mandal and is represented by the  Nuzvid (GN) Assembly constituency, which in turn represents Andhra Pradeshs Eluru Lok Sabha constituency.  the MLA representing Nuzvid constituency is Meka Venkata prtap apparao of the YSR Congress Party.

Economy

Agriculture is the main occupation.

Transport 

Eluru is the nearest railway station to the village. It is administered under Secunderabad railway division of the South Central Railway zone. NH 5 is the nearest highway to the village, which connects Chennai in Tamil Nadu to Kolkata in West Bengal.

References 

Villages in Krishna district